The Two Crusaders is a 1968 comedy film directed by Giuseppe Orlandini, co-written by horror icon Lucio Fulci and starring the comic duo Franco and Ciccio.

Plot 
Viscount Ciccio is on the bill, so the people who live in his lands begin to stop paying his taxes. So he goes in search of a soldier of fortune to threaten the plebs and collect the money. Ciccio manages to find him, but soon he will understand that the man is suitable for everything except being a proper knight.

Cast 
 Franco Franchi as Franco di Carrapipi
 Ciccio Ingrassia as Ciccio Visconte di Braghelunge
 Janet Agren as Clorinda
 Fiorenzo Fiorentini as Ciccio's Consouler
 Umberto D'Orsi as Goffredo di Buglione
 Ignazio Leone as Biagio
 Marco Tulli as Fra Giulivo
 Nino Fuscagni as Richard the Pantherheart
 Gastone Pescucci   		
 Enzo Andronico as Man blind in one eye
 Fabio Testi as Warrior enlisting Franco and Ciccio
 Pietro Ceccarelli as Tazio
 Furio Meniconi as Saladin 
 Loris Gizzi 
 Paolo Poli as Narrator

See also        
 List of Italian films of 1968

References

External links

Films directed by Giuseppe Orlandini
Italian adventure comedy films
Films set in the Middle Ages
Italian buddy comedy films
1960s buddy comedy films
Crusades films
1960s adventure comedy films
Films scored by Lallo Gori
1968 comedy films
1968 films
1960s Italian-language films
1960s Italian films